Just Another Ordinary Day is the debut studio album by Patrick Watson, released in 2003.

Track listing
"Just Another Ordinary Day"
"Woods"
"Mary"
"Silent City"
"Shame"
"Brigette's Theme"
"Gealman"
"Fall"
"Sunday"

2003 debut albums
Patrick Watson (musician) albums